Demirhan may refer to:

People
 Evin Demirhan (born 1995), Turkish female sport wrestler
 Serol Demirhan (born 1988), Turkish footballer

Places
 Demirhan, Sultanhisar, a village in the district of Sultanhisar, Aydın Province, Turkey
 The Turkish name of Trachoni, Nicosia, a village in Cyprus

See also
 Demirhanlar (disambiguation)